Swami Smaranananda (born 1929) is a senior monk of the Ramakrishna Math and Ramakrishna Mission, and is its 16th president. He joined the organization in 1952, and was elected president on 17 July 2017.

Early life and education 
Smaranananda was born in 1929 in the village of Andami, in the Tanjavur district of Tamil Nadu, India, to a Tamil Hindu family with joint identity. He was raised by his aunt, and finished secondary school in Chennai in 1946.

Religious career
He received initiation from Swami Shankarananda in 1952, and joined the Ramakrishna Order that same year at its Mumbai center. He was granted vows of Brahmacharya in 1956 and Sannyasa in 1960, both by Swami Shankarananda.

In 1958, he was posted to Advaita Ashrama in Kolkata, and served there for 18 years in various capacities, including some years as assistant editor of Prabuddha Bharata, the English-language journal founded by Swami Vivekananda. In 1976, he became the secretary of the Ramakrishna Mission Saradapitha, a large educational institution located next to Belur Math, where he served for nearly 15 years. In 1991, he became the head of Sri Ramakrishna Math, Chennai.

In 1983, he was appointed a trustee of the Ramakrishna Math and a member of the governing body of the Ramakrishna Mission. In 1997, he became the general secretary of the organization, and was made a vice president in 2007.  

The 15th president, Swami Atmasthananda, took samadhi on 18 June 2017. Swami Smaranananda, who had been the seniormost vice president, was elected to the post of president on 17 July 2017. Mamata Banerjee, the chief minister of Bengal, tweeted as follows on getting the news: "Pranam and heartfelt wishes to Swami Smaranananda Maharaj for being selected for the post of President of Ramakrishna Math and Mission".

As president, his primary function is as spiritual head of the organization. In that connection, he grants spiritual initiation to spiritual seekers.

Recent activities
In April 2017, Swami Smaranananda  inaugurated a toy train at an event at Belur Math. The toy train will pick up and ride people around the Math campus.

In December 2017, he opened the newly renamed headquarters building of the Ramakrishna Mission at Belur Math, now named for its first general secretary, Swami Saradananda.

Works 
 Musings of a Monk : This book is a collection of 68 articles on a variety of subjects, from spiritual writings to a travel log of his many trips around India and to the west. ()
 Smriti Smaran Anudhyan : Bengali version of the book Musings of a Monk.

References

External links 

  Belurmath.org

 
Presidents of the Ramakrishna Order
Indian Hindu monks
1929 births
Monks of the Ramakrishna Mission
Living people